Tower Insurance Premiership is the top division of the Cook Islands Football Association in Cook Islands. The winner qualifies for the OFC Champions League.

Current champions
Nikao Sokattak F.C. won the 2021 Tower Insurance Premiership.

Competing Clubs
The following clubs are competing in the 2022 season: The 2,000 capacity National Stadium is one of the venues.

Avatiu
Matavera
Nikao Sokattack
Puaikura
Titikaveka
Tupapa Maraerenga

First Division winners

1950: Titikaveka
1951–70: Unknown
1971: Titikaveka
1972: Titikaveka
1973: Titikaveka
1974: Titikaveka
1975: Titikaveka
1976: Titikaveka
1977: Titikaveka
1978: Titikaveka
1979: Titikaveka
1980: Avatiu
1981: Titikaveka
1982: Titikaveka
1983: Titikaveka
1984: Titikaveka
1985: Arorangi / Puaikura
1986: Unknown
1987: Arorangi / Puaikura
1988–90: Unknown
1991: Avatiu
1992: Tupapa Maraerenga
1993: Tupapa Maraerenga
1994: Avatiu
1995: PTC Coconuts
1996: Avatiu
1997: Avatiu
1998–99: Tupapa Maraerenga
1999: Avatiu
2000: Nikao Sokattack
2001: Tupapa Maraerenga
2002: Tupapa Maraerenga
2003: Tupapa Maraerenga
2004: Nikao Sokattack
2005: Nikao Sokattack
2006: Nikao Sokattack
2007: Tupapa Maraerenga
2008: Nikao Sokattack
2009: Nikao Sokattack
2010: Tupapa Maraerenga
2011: Tupapa Maraerenga
2012: Tupapa Maraerenga
2013: Puaikura
2014: Tupapa Maraerenga
2015: Tupapa Maraerenga
2016: Puaikura
2017: Tupapa Maraerenga
2018: Tupapa Maraerenga
2019: Tupapa Maraerenga
2020: Tupapa Maraerenga
2021: Nikao Sokattack
2022: Tupapa Maraerenga

Titles

Notes:
 Includes 2 titles won as Arorangi FC.

Second Division winners
1985: Titikaveka
1986: Titikaveka
1987–96: Unknown
1997: Air Raro
1998–99: Titikaveka
2000: Takuvaine
2001–03: Unknown
2004: Takuvaine
2005: Takuvaine
2006: Takuvaine

References

External links
League at fifa.com
League at soccerway.com

 
1
Top level football leagues in Oceania
1950 establishments in the Cook Islands
Recurring sporting events established in 1950